The  Omaha Nighthawks season was the second season for the United Football League franchise.

Offseason
The team fired previous head coach Jeff Jagodzinski following the 2010 season after losing the last four games and slipping out of the playoffs. Joe Moglia, an Omaha native who had originally been assigned as head coach of the expansion Virginia Destroyers, was reassigned to Omaha to replace Jagodzinski.

The Nighthawks have also changed stadiums, moving from Johnny Rosenblatt Stadium, where they spent their inaugural season, to TD Ameritrade Park in the downtown area of Omaha.

UFL Draft

Hartford Colonials dispersal draft
R1. Orrin Thompson, OT
R2. Chad Nkang, LB
R3. Kyle Calloway, OT
R4. Lorenzo Booker, RB
R5. Cecil Newton, C

Personnel

Staff

Roster

Schedule

Standings

Game summaries

Week 1: vs. Virginia Destroyers

Week 3: at Sacramento Mountain Lions

Week 4: at Las Vegas Locomotives

Week 5: vs. Las Vegas Locomotives

Week 6: vs. Sacramento Mountain Lions

References

Omaha Nighthawks season
Omaha Nighthawks seasons
Omaha Nighthawks